is a public university in Maebashi, Gunma, Japan. The predecessor of the school was founded in 1993, and it was chartered as a university in 2005.

External links
 Official website 

Educational institutions established in 1993
Public universities in Japan
Universities and colleges in Gunma Prefecture
Nursing schools in Japan
1993 establishments in Japan
Maebashi